Carlos Capelán (Montevideo, Uruguay, 1948) is a contemporary artist.

Career 
Although his conceptual work includes drawings and paintings, his installations are more widely known for their atmospherical impact, constituting an environment in which the viewer is free to wander around and experience notions of displacement. In 1995, Capelán received the Guggenheim Fellowship.

In 1973, Capelán moved to Lund, Sweden. Capelán studied at Grafikskolan Forum in Malmö, Sweden. Capelán currently resides in Moravia, Costa Rica.

Notable Exhibitions
 1991 In Progress, Kunstler Werkstatt Munich, Germany
 1992 Ante América (Installation), Banco de la Republica, Biblioteca L.A. Arango Bogotá, Colombia
 1992 Kartor och Landskap (Installation), Lunds Konsthall Lund, Sweden
 1993 In Fusion - New European Art, Ikon Gallery Birmingham, England
 1993 Bedia och Capelan (Installation), Kulturhuset Stockholm, Sweden
 1994 Installation & Paintings, Galería Fernando Quintana Bogotá Bogotá, Colombia
 1994 Humanism and Technology, National Museum of Contemporary Art Seoul, Republic of Korea
 1995 Facade Installation, Museum of Contemporary Art Chicago, Chicago, Illinois
 1995 Viajeros del Sur (2 installations), Museo Carillo Gil Mexico
 1996 Arbeten på papper, Galerie Leger Malmö, Sweden
 1996 Installation, Lund's Cathedral Lund, Sweden
 1997 Die Welt als Vortstellung, Monique Knowlton Gallery New York City, United States

References
 Sullivan, Edward J., Latin American Art in the Twentieth-Century. Phaidon Press Limited; London, 1996, pg. 280.
 https://web.archive.org/web/20100119010905/http://www.iniva.org/library/archive/people/c/capelan_carlos

Uruguayan painters
Uruguayan male artists
Contemporary painters
1948 births
Living people
People from Montevideo
People from Lund
Male painters